Cornelis "Kees" van Geelkerken ( 19 March 1901 – 29 March 1976) was a Dutch fascist political leader and Nazi collaborator. 

Van Geelkerken was born in 1901 to a Dutch family in Molenbeek-Saint-Jean, Belgium, and grew up in Utrecht. He gravitated toward fascism in the 1920s while working as a municipal employee in Zeist and Utrecht. Van Geelkerken co-founded the far-right National Socialist Movement in the Netherlands (NSB) with Anton Mussert in 1931. He was made the leader of the Nationale Jeugdstorm, the party's youth corps.

In 1943, during the German occupation of the Netherlands, Van Geelkerken was appointed Inspector-General of the Nederlandse Landwacht, a collaborationist paramilitary created by the Germans to combat the Dutch resistance. He was expelled from the NSB in early 1945 after a falling out with Mussert. After the war, he was tried in the Bijzonder Gerechtshof ("Special Court of Justice") and sentenced to life imprisonment, but was later released in 1959. He died in 1976 in Ede.

See also
 Netherlands in World War II
 Quisling

Works
 Voor Volk en Vaderland, Utrecht, 1943

References

 Nazi Rule and Dutch Collaboration: The Netherlands under German Occupation, 1940-45 by Gerhard Hirschfeld
 Dutch Under German Occupation: 1940-1945 by Werner Warmbrunn
 The Patriotic Traitors: A History of Collaboration in German-Occupied Europe, 1940-45 by David Littlejohn
 Biographical Dictionary of the Extreme Right Since 1890 edited by Philip Rees, 1991,

External links

1901 births
1976 deaths
People from Molenbeek-Saint-Jean
National Socialist Movement in the Netherlands politicians
Dutch collaborators with Nazi Germany
Dutch political party founders